Karl Gunnar Malmgren (1862 – May 21, 1921) was an architect in the Pacific Northwest. During much of his career, he  worked in partnership with architect Kirtland  Cutter (1860–1939).

Biography
Malmgren was born in Örebro, Sweden and studied architecture and decorative arts throughout Sweden and Germany. Malmgren worked with Swedish architect, P.L. Anderson for seven years upon completing his schooling.  Malmgren immigrated to the United States in 1888, initially settling in Seattle.  In 1889, Malmgren moved to Spokane and started working for K. R. Cutter and Company, also known as Cutter & Poetz. With the retirement of John Poetz in 1894/1895, the firm was restructured as Cutter & Malmgren. The partnership closed in 1917, after which Karl Malmgren and Kirtland Cutter  continued in individual practice.  Around 1919, Malmgren  entered partnership with Spokane architect  Charles I. Carpenter (1888-1938).

Personal life
Malmgren married Mary Arneson in 1891 and they eventually had five children: Louise, Carl, Marie, Arthur and Frances.
He died from throat cancer in Spokane on May 21, 1921, at age 58.

References 

1862 births
1921 deaths
Kirtland Cutter buildings
19th-century American architects
Arts and Crafts architects
Rustic style architects
Artists from Spokane, Washington
Architects from Washington (state)
Swedish emigrants to the United States
20th-century American architects